Delta Air Lines Flight 9877 was a crew training flight operated on a Douglas DC-8. On March 30, 1967, it lost control and crashed into a residential area during a simulated engine-out approach to Louis Armstrong New Orleans International Airport.

Aircraft
N802E was a Douglas DC-8-51. It was purchased by Delta Air Lines on September 14, 1959 and had since then accumulated a total of 23,391 flight hours. The aircraft was equipped with four Pratt & Whitney JT3D-1 engines. It never had any previous failures and problems. The plane was perfectly configured for takeoff, with an acceptable center of gravity and MTOW.<ref name="AAR-67-AG Final Report"

Crew 
Captain Maurice G. Watson, age 44, had accumulated 19,008 flight hours, of which 475 were in the DC-8. He held ratings for the DC-3, DC-6,DC-7, DC-8, DC-9 and CV 240/340/440. He was hired on June 3, 1949.<ref name="AAR-67-AG Final Report"

Captain James W. Morton, age 48, had accumulated 16,929 flight hours, of which 15 were in the DC-8. He held ratings for the DC-3, DC-6,DC-7, DC-9 and CV 240/340/440. He was hired on March 13, 1951.<ref name="AAR-67-AG Final Report"

Captain William T. Jeter, Jr., age 33, had accumulated 2,715 flight hours as a flight engineer, of which 529 were in the DC-8. He held ratings for the DC-6,DC-7, DC-9 and CV 240/340/440. He was hired on October 9, 1959.<ref name="AAR-67-AG Final Report"

Flight engineer David E. Posey, age 25, had accumulated 1,371 flight hours as a flight engineer, of which 667 were in the DC-8. He was hired on November 14, 1964.<ref name="AAR-67-AG Final Report"

Flight engineer George Plazza, age 30, had accumulated a total of 802 flight hours as an engineer. He was hired on May 3, 1965.<ref name="AAR-67-AG Final Report"

Flight
The aircraft left the ramp at 00:40 CST. Flying in the left seat was the captain in training and in the right seat was the check captain. The pilots being trained on that day were a captain-trainee and a flight engineer-trainee. Additionally, the flight engineer-instructor was being given a proficiency check. At 00:43 the pilots informed the controller that they were ready for take-off and would like to circle and then land on runway 1. At V1, an engine was shut down, as part of the procedure and the plane took off normally. During climbout the second engine was shut down. At 00:46 the captain-trainee was informed that the rudder power was lost (this was only indicated by a warning light, rather than shutting of the rudder power). At 00:47 the tower cleared them for landing on runway 1. They would simulate a two-engine out approach, make a full stop landing, and then take off again from runway 19. The altitude decreased to 900 feet, and flaps were set to 25. The altitude then increased to 1,100 feet, causing the airspeed to decrease to 180 knots. Shortly afterwards, landing flaps were lowered, and the plane descended through 650 feet at 165 knots. The airspeed decayed, to around 136 knots. The crew increased the power on engines 3 and 4, since engines 1 and 2 were turned off. This caused the airplane to enter an ever increasing left bank, which capped at 60°, with a descent angle of 14°. The aircraft hit power lines and a trees around 2,300 feet short of the runway threshold. It slashed through the corner of a house, hit a panel truck and contacted ground. It skidded, destroyed/severely damaged 2 houses, before coming to rest against the buildings of a motel complex, killing 13 people on the ground, along with all 6 people on board.<ref name="AAR-67-AG Final Report"

Investigation
The instructor lowered full landing flaps, on his own initiative, too early in the approach. The drag caused by the flaps caused the airspeed to decay, and rate of descent to increase, to which the captain-trainee responded with pitching the nose up, instead of using thrust. The instructor failed to intervene, which was probably a result of his confidence in the captain-trainee. The crew was also probably affected by fatigue.

Probable cause
The investigators concluded that the probable cause of the accident is:

See also
Airbus Industrie Flight 129
Airborne Express Flight 827
KLM Cityhopper Flight 433

References 

Aviation accidents and incidents in the United States in 1967
Accidents and incidents involving the Douglas DC-8
Airliner accidents and incidents in Louisiana